The 2004 African Women's Handball Championship was the 16th edition of the African Women's Handball Championship, held in Egypt from 9 to 18 April 2004. It acted as the African qualifying tournament for the 2005 World Women's Handball Championship.

Preliminary round
All times are local (UTC+2).

Group A

Group B

Knockout stage

Bracket

5–8th place bracket

5–8th place semifinals

Semifinals

Seventh place game

Fifth place game

Third place game

Final

Final ranking

External links
Results on todor66.com

2004 Women
African Women's Handball Championship
African Women's Handball Championship
2004 in Egyptian sport
2004 in African handball
Women's handball in Egypt
April 2004 sports events in Africa
2004 in African women's sport